Jack Protz (born April 14, 1948) is a former American football linebacker. He played for the San Diego Chargers in 1970.

References

1948 births
Living people
American football linebackers
North Carolina Tar Heels football players
Syracuse Orange football players
San Diego Chargers players
Players of American football from Jersey City, New Jersey
Woodbridge High School (New Jersey) alumni